The 54th Cannes Film Festival started on 14 May and ran until 20 May 2001. Norwegian actress and director Liv Ullmann was the Jury President. The Palme d'Or went to the Italian film The Son's Room by Nanni Moretti.

The festival opened with Moulin Rouge!, directed by Baz Luhrmann and closed with Les âmes fortes, directed by Raúl Ruiz. The Un Certain Regard section opened with 'R Xmas directed by Abel Ferrara and closed with The Words of My Father (Le parole di mio padre) directed by Francesca Comencini.

Juries

Main competition
The following people were appointed as the Jury for the feature films of the 2001 Official Selection:
 Liv Ullmann, (Norway) Jury President
 Mimmo Calopresti (Italy)
 Charlotte Gainsbourg (United Kingdom)
 Terry Gilliam (United States)
 Mathieu Kassovitz (France)
 Sandrine Kiberlain (France)
 Philippe Labro (France)
 Julia Ormond (United Kingdom)
 Moufida Tlatli (Tunisia)
 Edward Yang (Taiwan)

Un Certain Regard
The following people were appointed as the Jury of the 2001 Un Certain Regard:
 Ariane Ascaride (actress) President
 Florence Malraux
 François-Guillaume Lorrain (critic)
 Thomas Sotinel (critic)
 Virginie Apiou (critic)

Cinéfondation and short films
The following people were appointed as the Jury of the Cinéfondation and short films competition:
 Erick Zonca (director) President
 Lynne Ramsay (director)
 Rithy Panh (director)
 Samira Makhmalbaf (director)
 Valeria Bruni-Tedeschi (actress)

Camera d'Or
The following people were appointed as the Jury of the 2001 Camera d'Or:
 Maria de Medeiros (actress, director) President
 Loïc Barbier (cinephile)
 Stefano Della Casa (critic)
 Sophie Denize (representative of the technical industries)
 Franck Garbaz (critic)
 Mercedes Goiz (critic)
 Dominique Le Rigoleur (cinematographer)
 Claire Simon (director)

Official selection

In competition - Feature film
The following feature films competed for the Palme d'Or:

 Desert Moon (Tsuki no sabaku) by Shinji Aoyama
 Distance by Hirokazu Koreeda
 I'm Going Home (Je rentre à la maison) by Manoel de Oliveira
 In Praise of Love (Éloge de l'amour) by Jean-Luc Godard
 Kandahar (Safar-e Ghandehar) by Mohsen Makhmalbaf
 The Man Who Wasn't There by Joel Coen
 Millennium Mambo by Hou Hsiao-hsien
 Moulin Rouge! by Baz Luhrmann
 Mulholland Drive by David Lynch
 No Man's Land by Danis Tanović
 The Officers' Ward (La chambre des officiers) by François Dupeyron
 Pau and His Brother (Pau i el seu germà) by Marc Recha
 The Piano Teacher (La Pianiste) by Michael Haneke
 The Pledge by Sean Penn
 The Profession of Arms (Il mestiere delle armi) by Ermanno Olmi
 Replay (La répétition) by Catherine Corsini
 Roberto Succo by Cédric Kahn
 Shrek by Andrew Adamson and Vicky Jenson
 Taurus (Telets) by Alexander Sokurov
 The Son's Room (La stanza del figlio) by Nanni Moretti
 Va savoir by Jacques Rivette
 Warm Water Under a Red Bridge (Akai Hashi no Shita no Nurui Mizu) by Shōhei Imamura
 What Time Is It There? (Ni na bian ji dian) by Tsai Ming-liang

Un Certain Regard
The following films were selected for the competition of Un Certain Regard:

 The Anniversary Party by Jennifer Jason Leigh and Alan Cumming
 Atanarjuat: The Fast Runner by Zacharias Kunuk
 Boyhood Loves (Amour d'enfance) by Yves Caumon
 Carrément à l'Ouest by Jacques Doillon
 The Chimp (Maimil) by Aktan Abdykalykov
 Clément by Emmanuelle Bercot
 A Dog's Day (Pattiyude Divasam) by Murali Nair
 Freedom (La libertad) by Lisandro Alonso
 Get a Life (Ganhar a Vida) by João Canijo
 H Story by Nobuhiro Suwa
 Hijack Stories by Oliver Schmitz
 Just the Two of Us (Ty da ia da my s tobo) by Alexander Veledinsky
 Kairo by Kiyoshi Kurosawa
 Lan Yu by Stanley Kwan
 Late Marriage (Hatouna Mehuheret) by Dover Kosashvili
 Lovely Rita by Jessica Hausner
 Man Walking on Snow (Aruku, hito) by Masahiro Kobayashi
 No Such Thing by Hal Hartley
 'R Xmas by Abel Ferrara
 The Road (Jol) by Darezhan Omirbaev
 Storytelling by Todd Solondz
 Tears of the Black Tiger (Fah talai jone) by Wisit Sasanatieng
 Tomorrow (Domani) by Francesca Archibugi
 The Words of My Father (Le parole di mio padre) by Francesca Comencini

Films out of competition
The following films were selected to be screened out of competition:

 ABC Africa by Abbas Kiarostami
 Apocalypse Now Redux by Francis Ford Coppola
 Avalon by Mamoru Oshii
 CQ by Roman Coppola
 Human Nature by Michel Gondry
 My Voyage to Italy by Martin Scorsese
 Les âmes fortes by Raúl Ruiz
 Sobibór, 14 octobre 1943, 16 heures by Claude Lanzmann
 The Center of the World by Wayne Wang
 Trouble Every Day by Claire Denis

Cinéfondation
The following films were selected for the competition of Cinéfondation:

 Antiromantika by Nariman Turebayev
 Bucarest - Vienne 8: 15 by Cătălin Mitulescu
 Crow Stone by Alicia Duffy
 Dai Bi by Chao Yang
 Fuldmane Vanvid by Anders Worm
 I Can Fly To You But You... by Young-Nam Kim
 J'espère, J'attends by Ewa Banaszkiewicz
 L'age Tendre by Eric Forestier
 La Cire, Ça Fait Mal by Maya Dreifuss
 Le Jour Où Toshi Est Né by Hikaru Yoshikawa
 Les Yeux Devorants by Syllas Tzoumerkas
 Martin Quatre Ans by Ben Hackworth
 Monsieur William, Les Traces D'une Vie Possible by Denis Gaubert
 Portrait by Sergei Luchishin
 Premiere Experience De Mort by Aida Begić
 Reparation by Jens Jonsson
 Svetlo by David Sukup
 Telecommande by Ethan Tobman
 Un Veau Pleurait, La Nuit by John Shank
 Zero Deficit by Ruth Mader

Short film competition
The following short films competed for the Short Film Palme d'Or:

 Bean Cake by David Greenspan
 Chicken by Barry Dignam
 Bird in the Wire by Phillip Donnellon
 La Famille Sacree by Dong-Il Shin
 Daddy's Girl by Irvine Allan
 The Reel Truth by Tim Hamilton
 Just Little Birds (Les petits oiseaux) by Fred Louf
 Natural Glasses (Naturlige Briller) by Jens Lien
 Music for One Apartment and Six Drummers by Johannes Stjärne Nilsson and Ola Simonsson
 Paulette by Louise-Marie Colon
 Pizza Passionata by Kari Juusonen

Parallel sections

International Critics' Week
The following films were screened for the 40th International Critics' Week (40e Semaine de la Critique):

Feature film competition

 Under the Moonlight (Zir-e Noor-e Maah) by Seyyed Reza Mir-Karimi (Iran)
 Unloved by Kunitoshi Manda (Japan)
 Bolivia by Adrián Caetano (Argentina)
 The Woman Who Drinks (La Femme qui boit) by Bernard Émond (Canada)
 The Pornographer (Le Pornographe) by Bertrand Bonello (France, Canada)
 Almost Blue by Alex Infascelli (Italy)
 Ephemeral Town (Efimeri poli) by Giorgos Zafiris (Greece)

Short film competition

 Le Dos au mur by Bruno Collet (France)
 Eat by Bill Plympton (United States)
 Forklift Driver Klaus – The First Day on the Job (Staplerfahrer Klaus - Der erste Arbeitstag) by Jörg Wagner and Stefan Prehn (Germany)
 Field by Duane Hopkins (United Kingdom)
 L'Enfant de la haute mer by L. Gabrielli, P. Marteel, M. Renoux and M. Tourret (France)
 Stranger and Native (Biganeh va boumi) by Ali Mohammad Ghasem (Iran)
 Noche de Bodas by Carlos Cuarón (Mexico)

Special screenings

 The Black Beach (La plage noire) by Michel Piccoli (France) (opening film)
 Kes by Ken Loach (United Kingdom) (La séance du Parrain)
 Souffle by Muriel Coulin (France) (17 min.) (Prix de la Critique)
 True Love Waits (Taivas Tiella) by Johanna Vuoksenmaa (Finland) (34 min.) (Prix de la Critique)
 Clouds: Letters to My Son (Nuages: Lettres à mon fils) by Marion Hänsel (Belgium) (closing film)

Directors' Fortnight
The following films were screened for the 2001 Directors' Fortnight (Quinzaine des Réalizateurs): 

 Big Bad Love by Arliss Howard
 Bintou by Fanta Régina Nacro (31 min.)
 Boli shaonu by Lai Miu-suet
 That Old Dream That Moves (Ce vieux rêve qui bouge) by Alain Guiraudie (50 min.)
 Ceci est mon corps by Rodolphe Marconi
 Central by Dominique Gonzalez-Foerster (10 min.)
 Chelsea Walls by Ethan Hawke
 Cyber Palestine by Elia Suleiman (16 min.)
 Ecce homo by Mirjam Kubescha (50 min.)
 Fatma by Khaled Ghorbal
 Hautes Herbes by Mathieu Gérault (26 min.)
 HK by Xavier de Choudens (14 min.)
 Hush! by Ryosuke Hashiguchi
 I nostri anni by Daniele Gaglianone
 Je t'aime John Wayne by Toby MacDonald (10 min.)
 Jeunesse dorée by Zaïda Ghorab-Volta
 The Orphan of Anyang (Ānyáng de gūér) by Wang Chao
 La Trace de Moloktchon by Louis Jammes
 The Crossing (La Traversée) by Sébastien Lifshitz
 Le Système Zsygmondy by Luc Moullet (18 min.)
 Les Pleureuses by Jorane Castro (15 min.)
 Made in the USA by Cindy Babski and Sólveig Anspach
 Stuff and Dough (Marfa si Banii) by Cristi Puiu
 Martha... Martha by Sandrine Veysset
 A Place on Earth by Artur Aristakisyan
 Ming dai ahui zhu by Hsiao Ya-chuan
 On s'embrasse? by Pierre Olivier (6 min.)
 Operai, contadini by Danièle Huillet and Jean-Marie Straub
 Pauline et Paulette by Lieven Debrauwer
 Queenie in Love by Amos Kollek
 Rain by Christine Jeffs
 Riyo by Dominique Gonzalez-Foerster (10 min.)
 Shon by Julien Sallé (15 min.)
 Slogans by Gjergj Xhuvani
 The Deep End by David Siegel and Scott McGehee
 The Heart of the World by Guy Maddin (5 min.)

Awards

Official awards
The following films and people received the 2001 Official selection awards:
Palme d'Or: The Son's Room (La stanza del figlio) by Nanni Moretti
Grand Prix: The Piano Teacher (La Pianiste) by Michael Haneke
Best Director: 
 David Lynch for Mulholland Dr.
 Joel Coen for The Man Who Wasn't There
Best Screenplay: No Man's Land by Danis Tanović
Best Actress: Isabelle Huppert for The Piano Teacher
Best Actor: Benoît Magimel for The Piano Teacher
Un Certain Regard
Un Certain Regard Award: Amour d'enfance by Yves Caumon
Cinéfondation
 First Prize: Portrait by Sergei Luchishin
 Second Prize: Reparation by Jens Jonsson
 Third Prize: Dai Bi by Chao Yang & Crow Stone by Alicia Duffy
Golden Camera 
Caméra d'Or: Atanarjuat: The Fast Runner by Zacharias Kunuk
Short Films
Short Film Palme d'Or: Bean Cake by David Greenspan
 Short film Jury Prize: Daddy's Girl by Irvine Allan & Pizza Passionata by Kari Juusonen

Independent awards
FIPRESCI Prizes
 Martha... Martha by Sandrine Veysset (Director's Fortnight)
 La stanza del figlio by Nanni Moretti (In competition)
 Le Pornographe by Bertrand Bonello (International Critics Week)
 Kôrei by Kiyoshi Kurosawa (Un Certain Regard)
Commission Supérieure Technique
 Technical Grand Prize: Tu Duu-Chih (Sound department) in What Time Is It There? and Millennium Mambo
Ecumenical Jury
 Prize of the Ecumenical Jury: Safar-e Ghandehar by Mohsen Makhmalbaf
 Ecumenical Jury - Special Mention: Pauline and Paulette by Lieven Debrauwer
Award of the Youth
 French Film: Clément by Emmanuelle Bercot
 Foreign Film: Slogans by Gjergj Xhuvani
Awards in the frame of International Critics' Week
 Grand Prix Primagaz: Zir-e noor-e maah by Seyyed Reza Mir-Karimi
 Future talent Award : Unloved, by Kunitoshi Manda (Japon)
 Prix Grand Rail d'Or : Unloved, by Kunitoshi Manda (Japon)
 Prix Petit Rail d'Or : "Le dos au mur, de Bruno Collet (France) - court metrage
 Canal+ Award: Eat by Bill Plympton (USA)
 Young Critics Award - Best Short: Le dos au mur by Bruno Collet
 Young Critics Award - Best Feature: Bolivia by Adrián Caetano
Awards in the frame of Directors' Fortnight
 Media Award 2001 of the European Union : Une liaison pornographique, de Frédéric Fonteyne (Belgique)
 SACD Award : On s'embrasse ? by Pierre Olivier (France)
 Gras Savoye Award: HK by Xavier De Choudens
 Kodak Short Film Award: Bintou by Fanta Régina Nacro
 Kodak Short Film Award - Special Mention Le système Zsygmondy by Luc Moullet
Association Prix François Chalais
François Chalais Award: Made in the USA by Sólveig Anspach

References

Media
INA: The steps for the opening of the 2001 Festival (commentary in French)
INA: List of winners of the 2001 Festival (commentary in French)

External links

2001 Cannes Film Festival (web.archive)
Official website Retrospective 2001 
Cannes Film Festival:2001 at Internet Movie Database

Cannes Film Festival
Cannes Film Festival
Cannes Film Festival
Cannes Film Festival
Cannes Film Festival
Cannes Film Festival